≈Samant may refer to:

Titles:null

 Samanta, a title used in ancient and medieval India
 Samantray, a surname of Indian people.
 Samant (Doti), a title of the feudal kings from Doti region in present-day Nepal

People with the surname Samant:

 Bal Samant, Indian writer
 Dutta Samant, Indian politician
 Keshav Samant, Indian contract bridge player
 Mohan Samant, Indian painter
 Mohan Narayan Rao Samant, Indian naval officer
 Rajeev Samant, Indian businessman
 Satvasheela Samant, Indian linguist
 Uday Samant, Indian politician
 Vaishali Samant, Indian playback singer
 Vinayak Samant, Indian cricketer
 Anish Denoon, Indian rock band artist